The Double Event Stakes was an American Thoroughbred horse race held annually in two parts from 1889 through 1910 at Sheepshead Bay Race Track in Sheepshead Bay, Brooklyn, New York. A race on dirt for two-year-old colts and fillies, the first part was run on the track's opening day in June and at a distance of 5½ furlongs throughout its term. The second part was run in mid July at a distance of 5 3/4 furlongs until 1901 when it was set at six furlongs. Each race originally carried a guaranteed purse of $10,000 and a bonus of $1,000 to the owners of any horse who won both parts.

Dual winners
The Double Event was run for twenty-two years. In its first eight editions from 1889 through 1896, five horses won both parts but in the last fourteen from 1897 through 1910 there were none. Jockey Tod Sloan won both parts in 1898 on two different horses.

 Ŧ Denotes those who would be named an American Champion Two-Year-Old of the year.

Demise of the Double Event Stakes 
After years of uncertainty, on June 11, 1908 the Republican controlled New York Legislature under Governor Charles Evans Hughes passed the Hart–Agnew anti-betting legislation with penalties allowing for fines and up to a year in prison. The owners of Sheepshead Bay Race Track, and other racing facilities in New York State, struggled to stay in business without income from betting. Racetrack operators had no choice but to drastically reduce the purse money being paid out which resulted in the Double Event offering a purse in 1909 that was one-sixth of what it had been in earlier years. These small purses made horse racing highly unprofitable and impossible for even the most successful horse owners to continue in business. As such, for the 1910 racing season management of the Sheepshead Bay facility dropped some of its minor stakes races and used the purse money to bolster its most important events. The effect was to restore the purse offered for the Double Event to about half of what it had been. Further restrictive legislation was passed by the New York Legislature in 1910 which deepened the financial crisis for track operators and led to a complete shut down of racing across the state during 1911 and 1912. After a 1911 amendment to the law to limit the liability of owners and directors was defeated, every racetrack in New York State shut down. Owners, whose horses of racing age had nowhere to go, began sending them, their trainers and their jockeys to race in England and France. Many horses ended their racing careers there, and a number remained to become an important part of the European horse breeding industry. Thoroughbred Times reported that  more than 1,500 American horses were sent overseas between 1908 and 1913 and of them at least 24 were either past, present, or future Champions. When a February 21, 1913 ruling by the New York Supreme Court, Appellate Division saw horse racing return in 1913 it was too late for the Sheepshead Bay horse racing facility and it never reopened.

Records
John Madden was the dominant figure in both parts of the Double Event, winning the most races as both a trainer and as an owner.

Part 1 
Speed record:
 5.5 furlongs: 1:04.20 – Nasturtium (1901)

Most wins by a jockey:
 2 – Marty Bergen (1891, 1892)

Most wins by a trainer:
 4 – John E. Madden (1899, 1902, 1903, 1908)

Most wins by an owner:
 3 – John E. Madden (1899, 1903, 1908)

Part 2 
Speed record:
 5.75 furlongs: 1:09.60 – Victory (1891)
 6 furlongs: 1:11.00 – Conjurer (1903) & Footprint (1910)

Most wins by a jockey:
 3 – Fred Taral (1891, 1892, 1899)

Most wins by a trainer:
 3 – John E. Madden  (1897, 1901, 1908)

Most wins by an owner:
 3 – James R. Keene (1893, 1902, 1904)
 3 – John E. Madden  (1897, 1901, 1908)

Part 1 winners

Part 2 winners

References

Flat horse races for two-year-olds
Discontinued horse races in New York City
Sheepshead Bay Race Track
Recurring sporting events established in 1889
Recurring sporting events disestablished in 1910
1889 establishments in New York (state)
1910 disestablishments in New York (state)